Pretoria North is a suburb of the city of Pretoria, Gauteng, South Africa, with a population of 16,972 people according to the 2011 census.

Pretoria North was first settled in 1878 by a pioneer column of Afrikaner farmers who started farming alongside the passing Apies River. The Area became a stopping point for travelers moving through the North of Pretoria to the Northern Transvaal.

In 1904 an English medium primary School was established in Pretoria. This school was the antecedent to the current Laerskool Danie Malan on the corners of Rachel De Beer and Jan van Riebeeck streets in Pretoria North. This school has been an anchor of the Pretoria North Community for over 110 years and is rich in history and tradition.

Other Schools in the Pretoria North Precinct include, Laerskool Rachel de Beer, Laerskool Voortrekker Eeufees, High Schools Hoërskool Gerrit Maritz and Hoërskool Pretoria-Noord. Judging by the structure of the education system in Pretoria North, it is possible to recognise that Pretoria North is a primarily Afrikaans speaking area. All schools in the area are Afrikaans medium.

As the name suggests, it is situated to the north of the city centre. The Railway connecting Pretoria with Polokwane was laid down by the Paul Kruger Administration in between 1886 and 1899. The Construction was disrupted by the Anglo Boer War but it was finalized before 1910. The Wonderboom station of the railway line is part of the Pretoria North complex and was a reason why the area developed into a small town of its own, functionally connected to the greater city of Pretoria.

With transport being its main industry, Pretoria North has two automobile sales corridors in the form of Rachel De Beer street and Gerrit Maritz streets being home to over 50 car dealerships. Pretoria North has one of the highest concentration of car dealerships in the country.

Transport is the core of Pretoria North's industrial activity. The area boasts a light motor industrial corridor couched by east and Gerrit Maritz Streets. Glass makers, panel beaters, parts manufacturers and mechanics work in the chain of warehouses in this eastern corridor.

At the heart of the Pretoria North CBD is the North Park shopping mall which is a very small and quiet shopping center not maintained anymore. The main retail activity in Pretoria North takes place in the displaced retail center of Shoprite located on the corner of Ben Viljoen and Gerrit Maritz Streets. Other business centers include Solomons General Dealers on Gerrit Maritz Street and Tele Tech on Ben Viljoen Street.

The Pretoria North area is largely residential with the Rachel De Beer and Gerrit Maritz corridors straddled by Ben Viljoen Street being the central business district. The Town Planning that went into designing Pretoria North was very poor as the area did not leave space for cultural landmarks and heritage sites.

Pretoria North sometimes refers to the general area to the North of the City of Pretoria. This general definition is broad and encompasses the Wonderboom area to the east of Lavender Road and Akasia to the west of Daan De Wet Nel Drive. This broad definition of Pretoria North is a colloquial concept and is not to be confused with the concept in this article.

The Onderstepoort campus of the University of Pretoria Faculty of Veterinary Science, and the Wonderboom Airport are nearby.

References

 Industrial Geographer

Suburbs of Pretoria